Nehusha (lit. Steadfast) is a moshav in central Israel. Located five kilometres north-east of Beit Guvrin, it falls under the jurisdiction of Mateh Yehuda Regional Council.

History
The moshav was established in 1955 on the land of the depopulated  Palestinian  village of Umm Burj. but collapsed in 1968. It was re-established in 1981. Its name is derived from the name of the Biblical town of Ir-Nachash (1 Chronicles 4:12) nearby and from Psalms 18:35 (where it is translated as brass, although its meaning is steadfast or firm);
Who traineth my hands for war, so that mine arms do bend a bow of brass.

Archaeology
In 2004, an archaeological excavation was conducted at Nehusha by Rona Avissar on behalf of Bar Ilan University's Department of Land of Israel Studies and Archaeology.

Gallery

References

External links
Village website 

Moshavim
1955 establishments in Israel
Populated places established in 1955
Populated places in Jerusalem District